Wittia klapperichi is a moth of the family Erebidae. It is found in southern China (Zhejiang, Fujian, Sichuan, Yunnan and Guangdong).

References

Moths described in 1954
Lithosiina